This page is about a village in the Rangeet valley 16 km from Darjeeling and is not to be confused with a neighbourhood of the same name in the outskirts of Darjeeling

Singla Tea Garden is a village in the Darjeeling Pulbazar CD block in the Darjeeling Sadar subdivision of the Darjeeling district in the state of West Bengal, India.

Geography

Location                                              

Area overview
The map alongside shows the northern portion of the Darjeeling Himalayan hill region. In Darjeeling Sadar subdivision 61% of the total population lives in the rural areas and 39% of the population lives in the urban areas. There are 78 tea gardens/ estates (the figure varies slightly according to different sources), producing and largely exporting Darjeeling tea in the district. It engages a large proportion of the population directly/ indirectly. Some tea gardens were identified in the 2011 census as census towns or villages. Such places are marked in the map as CT (census town) or R (rural/ urban centre). Specific tea estate pages are marked TE.

Note: The map alongside presents some of the notable locations in the subdivision. All places marked in the map are linked in the larger full screen map.

Demographics
According to the 2011 Census of India, Singla Tea Garden had a total population of 3,400 of which 1,715 (50%) were males and 1,685 (50%) were females. There were 293 persons in the age range of 0 to 6 years. The total number of literate people in Singla Tea Garden was 2.254 (66.29% of the population over 6 years).

Darjeeling Ropeway
Darjeeling Ropeway was started in 1968 from Singamari in Darjeeling. In 45 minutes, the ropeway transported passengers from a height of 7,000 ft down to 800 feet where the last station was located at Singla Bazar on the banks of the Rangeet. As of 2020, the ropeway runs only up to Tukvar.

Education
St. Mary's School in Singla valley has 480 students. Some of the students have to walk for an hour to reach the school.

References

Villages in Darjeeling district